The Golden Horse Audience Choice Award is an award presented annually at the Golden Horse Awards by the Taipei Golden Horse Film Festival Executive Committee. The latest ceremony was held in 2022, with the film Limbo receiving the award.

References

Golden Horse Film Awards